CKQ or ckq may refer to:
Chak Kambo railway station, Pakistan, station code CKQ
Kajakse language of Chad, ISA 639-3 code ckq

See also
, including several airports CKQ-